is a Japanese professional shogi player ranked 7-dan.

Early life
Yasuhiro Masuda was born on November 4, 1997 in Akishima, Tokyo. He learned shogi when he was about five years old after his mother brought home a board game box which included a shogi set.

In September 2008, Masuda entered the Japan Shogi Association's apprentice school at the rank of 6-kyū under the guidance of shogi professional Taku Morishita. He was promoted to the rank of 3-dan in April 2012, and obtained full professional status and the rank of 4-dan in October 2014 while a second-year high school student after finishing tied for first in the 55th 3-dan League with a record of 13 wins and 5 losses.

Shogi professional
In October 2016, Masuda won his first professional shogi tournament when he defeated Naohiro Ishida 2 games to none to win the 47th  title. He repeated the feat the following year when he defeated Daichi Sasaki 2 games to none to win the 48th Shinjin-Ō, thus becoming the first repeat winner since Takeshi Fujii in 1997. Masuda also advanced to the championship match of the 50th Shinjin-Ō tournament in October 2019 against Satoshi Takano and his attempt to become just the second three-time winner of the tournament started promising by winning Game 1; Takano, however, came back to win the next two games and the match.

On June 26, 2017, Masuda lost to Sōta Fujii in Ryūō ranking class game which was streamed live online and had received much pre-game press coverage both within Japan and internationally because a Fujii victory would allow him to set a new professional shogi record of 29 consecutive wins.

Promotion history
The promotion history for Masuda is as follows:
 6-kyū: September 2008
 3-dan: April 2012
 4-dan: October 1, 2014
 5-dan: January 12, 2018
 6-dan: May 22, 2018
 7-dan: February 8, 2023

Titles and other championships
Masuda has yet to appear in a major title match, but he is a two-time winner of the  tournament.

Notes

References

External links
ShogiHub: Professional Player Info · Masuda, Yasuhiro
Shogi Fan:
Masuda wins Shinjin Tournament
Masuda wins again the Shinjin tournament

Japanese shogi players
Living people
Professional shogi players
Professional shogi players from Tokyo Metropolis
1997 births
People from Akishima, Tokyo
Shinjin-Ō